Antoon Ven (born 21 July 1935) is a Belgian rower. He competed in the men's coxed pair event at the 1956 Summer Olympics.

References

1935 births
Living people
Belgian male rowers
Olympic rowers of Belgium
Rowers at the 1956 Summer Olympics
Sportspeople from Antwerp